A Walk in the Clouds is the original soundtrack recording of the 1995 Golden Globe-winning film A Walk in the Clouds starring Keanu Reeves, Aitana Sánchez-Gijón, Anthony Quinn, Giancarlo Giannini and Debra Messing. Released on the Milan Records label, the original score and songs were composed by Maurice Jarre, except "Crush the grapes" and the famous "Mariachi Serenade,” which were composed by Leo Brouwer (music) and Alfonso Arau (lyrics). The film won the Golden Globe Award for Best Original Score.

Track listing
 "Victoria" – 7:29
 "Butterfly Wings" – 2:54
 "The Harvest" – 3:01
 "Crush the Grapes" – 2:17
 "First Kiss" – 3:15
 "Mariachi Serenade" – 2:49
 "Fire and Destruction" – 10:17
 "A Walk in the Clouds" – 3:05

Credits
 Maurice Jarre – producer, composer 
 Liona Boyd – guitar 
 Febronio Covarrubias – performer 
 Ismael Gallegos Color D' Luna – performer 
 Juan Jimenez – performer 
 Roberto Huerta – performer 
 Alfonso Arau – lyrics 
 Leo Brouwer – composer

References

1995 soundtrack albums
Romance film soundtracks
Drama film soundtracks